The Division of Alcoholic Beverage Control is a Kansas state government agency responsible for enforcing the alcohol laws of Kansas. It issues state licenses and permits, monitors the flow of restricted products, inspects licensed premises and enforces restrictions on underage purchasing and drinking of alcohol. ABC Agents are state certified Law Enforcement agents, therefore being armed and possessing powers of arrest. While primarily focusing on the enforcement of the Kansas laws regarding liquor, tobacco and tax enforcement, Agents at times assist other law enforcement agencies with other matters of an urgent nature.

See also

List of law enforcement agencies in Kansas

References

External links
 Kansas Division of Alcoholic Beverage Control
Kansas Division of Alcoholic Beverage Control publications online at the KGI Online Library

State alcohol agencies of the United States
State law enforcement agencies of Kansas